The Wohl–Aue reaction is an organic reaction between an aromatic nitro compound and an aniline to form a phenazine in presence of an alkali base.  An example is the reaction between nitrobenzene and aniline:

The reaction is named after Alfred Wohl and W. Aue.

References

Heterocycle forming reactions
Organic redox reactions
Name reactions